MS is an Italian brand of cigarettes manufactured by the Italian subsidiary of British American Tobacco.

MS was manufactured by the Italian company Ente Tabacchi Italiani and owned by the Italian State Monopoly, until E.T.I was bought by British American Tobacco in 2004. This change made MS part of the BAT Italia line of brands. MS is mainly sold in Italy, but the brand is also sold in other European countries, such as Austria and Spain.

History
MS was originally founded in 1969 by the Italian company "Ente Tabacchi Italiani" and owned by the State Monopoly. Within a few years, it became the most popular brand of cigarettes in Italy due to the strong sense of "Italianism" the brand portrays.

The brand has appeared in many Italian movies, especially during the 1970s, and was even endorsed by Italian actor Nino Manfredi.

MS grew in popularity and in the mid-1980s, it reached its peak in sales. During that time, the brand also expanded in variants. MS was manufactured for years at the Manifattura Tabacchi plant in the city of Rovereto, Trentino. The factory was so important that it had its own set of train tracks leading from the railway station directly into the plant. The tracks of the line that led to the Stazione Leopolda passed through the factory, in the direction of Cascine, passing under the railway bridge.

The building was built during the Fascist era for the production of cigarettes. Over time, the Tobacco Factory replaced the two factories used for processing tobacco located at the ex-convent of St. Ursula. A plaque in the Piazza Puccini recalls how the Tobacco Factory was on the war front along the Mugone river in August 1944 and was subject to fierce fighting between the partisan fighter of the Italian resistance movement and forces of the Italian Social Republic and Nazi Germany during the Italian Civil War

The factory closed down on the 16th of March 2001, but MS cigarettes continue to be manufactured in Lecce, Apulia. The tobacco used for MS cigarettes was originally grown in Sardinia.

Sport sponsorship
MS was a sponsor of the Aprilia team in the MotoGP from its team's entrance into the sport in 2002 until its departure in 2004.

MS was also a sponsor of the Osella Formula 1 team in the 1980 Formula One season, with Eddie Cheever behind the wheel.

Markets
MS is mainly sold in Italy, but also is or was sold in Spain, France, Germany, Austria, Slovenia and Brazil.

Products

 MS Bionde (ex MS Filtro)
 MS Rosse (ex Mild)
MS Chiare (ex Light)
MS Bianche (ex Extra Light)
 821 full, blue, white AMERICAN BLEND (ex MS 821 with the E.T.I lion on the pack)
 MS International 100's
 MS 100's
 MS Red
 MS Rosa (ex Extra Mild)
 Club slim (ex MS Club)
 Brera slim (ex MS Brera)
 MS Blu
 MS Red
 MS Azzurre
 MS Special
 MS Stilo
 MS Classic
 MS Nazionali

Below are all the current brands of MS cigarettes sold, with the levels of tar, nicotine and carbon monoxide included.

See also

 Tobacco smoking

References

British American Tobacco brands
Products introduced in 1969
Italian brands